The Marine Corps Scholarship Foundation is a privately funded, 501(c)(3) non-profit organization that provides academic scholarships to children of United States Marines and Navy Corpsmen.  The Scholarship Foundation is the Nation's oldest and largest provider of need-based scholarship to military children. Their funding is provided by private supporters, including individuals, corporations, and other nonprofit foundations. The organization's mission is to "Honor Marines by Educating Their Children."

Work

Since its founding in 1962, the Marine Corps Scholarship Foundation has provided more than 40,000 scholarships, valued at over $125 million. Their scholarships provide access to affordable education for the children of Marines and Navy Corpsmen attending post-high school, undergraduate, and career technical education programs. 

The Scholarship Foundation's scholarship reports that:
•	45% of recipients majors in STEM (Science, Technology, Engineering, and Math) and health science majors (compared to 33% nationally)
•	50% are first-generation college students (compared to 33% nationally)
•	90% of recipients graduate or are on track to graduate (compared to 53% nationally)

In addition, the Scholarship Foundation has been recognized by the Better Business Bureau for satisfying 20 out of 20 standards for charity accountability, transparency, and sound financial management.

The Scholarship Foundation's awards are primarily need-based. Qualified applicants must be the child of a Marine or Navy Corpsmen, and their maximum family income must not exceed that of the current pay scale of a sergeant major. 

The Scholarship Foundation cites the mounting toll of the War on Terror, the rising costs of education, and the maturation of a new generation of Marines as an urgent call for increasing support.

Scholarship applications are accepted January 1 - March 1, annually, via the Scholarship Foundation's website: www.mcsf.org

Origin

The Marine Corps Scholarship Foundation began by helping one child. In New York City in 1962, a group of service-minded Marines, led by Brigadier General Martin F. Rockmore, learned that a Marine World War II Medal of Honor recipient could not afford to send his child to college. Concerned, General Rockmore and his peers organized a charity ball that December, which raised $1,500 (1962 dollars); at the Ball, these funds were awarded as a scholarship to a single student. The annual charity ball, known as the New York Leatherneck Ball, continues to this day, and celebrated its 50th anniversary in 2012. The original event has inspired numerous balls, galas, golf tournaments, and other fundraisers across the country.  Today, the Scholarship Foundation, with the assistance of volunteers across the country, hosts more than 35 fundraising activities annually.

Special Commitments

Through its "Heroes Tribute for Children of the Fallen" and "Heroes Tribute for Children of the Wounded" scholarship programs, the Scholarship Foundation has made special commitments to the sons and daughters of Marines and Navy Corpsmen whose parent has been killed or wounded in combat.

Leadership

The Chairman of the Scholarship Foundation's  Board of Directors is Lieutenant General George J. Trautman III USMC (Ret.). Lieutenant General Robert R. Ruark USMC (Ret.) has served as the President and CEO of the Scholarship Foundation since 2017. Lieutenant General Stephen G. Olmstead served as Chairman of the Scholarship Foundation's in 1990s.

Location

The Marine Corps Scholarship Foundation is located in Alexandria, Virginia.

External links
 Marine Corps Scholarship Foundation

Organizations based in Alexandria, Virginia
Educational foundations in the United States
Organizations associated with the United States Marine Corps
Organizations established in 1962